The SnowCastle of Kemi is the biggest snow fort in the world. It is rebuilt every winter with a different architecture in Kemi, Finland. In 1996 the first snow castle drew 300,000 visitors. For several years the snowcastle was located in the Kemi city harbor. in 2017 the location was moved into a nearby park. Current address is Mansikkanokankatu 15.

The area covered by the castle has varied from 13,000 to over 20,000 square metres. The highest towers have been over 20 metres high and longest walls over 1,000 metres long, and the castle has had up to three stories. Despite its varying configurations, the snow castle has a few recurring elements: a chapel, a restaurant and a hotel.

 The SnowRestaurant has ice tables and seats covered with reindeer fur, as well as ice sculptures.
 The ecumenical SnowChapel with 50–100 seats has seen numerous weddings of couples from as far away as Japan and Hong Kong.
 The SnowHotel offers a choice of double rooms and a honeymoon suite, all of which are decorated by local artists using local materials.

The SnowCastle of Kemi also hosts such things as an adventure land for children, a theatre and ice art exhibitions with lights and sound effects. Many opera singers and dancers have performed in the SnowCastle of Kemi.

See also
Ice hotel
Ice palace

References

External links 
Kemi SnowCastle - The world's biggest snowcastle
 SnowCastle Image Gallery - Zipped photo collection
 Webcam pointed to the maingate of the SnowCastle
 photo company operating at kemi, photos of snowcastle

Tourist attractions in Finland
Buildings and structures made of snow or ice
Kemi
Buildings and structures in Lapland (Finland)
Tourist attractions in Lapland (Finland)